Daniel Joseph Jaffe (August 19, 1809 - January 21, 1874) was a German merchant who came to Belfast in 1850 to establish a linen export business. He was the father of Otto Jaffe, who was twice Lord Mayor of Belfast and its first and only Jewish Lord Mayor. He is regarded as the founder of Belfast's Jewish community and built the city's first synagogue in 1871. Prior to coming to Belfast, Jaffe owned a considerable mercantile business in Hamburg. His business was also active in Dundee, Leipzig, and Paris. He was born in Schwerin, Mecklenburg-Vorpommern in 1809 and died in Nice, France in 1874 aged 64 and is interred in the Jewish section of Belfast City Cemetery. In 1874, the same year of his death, a drinking fountain was erected to his memory at Victoria Square in Belfast. In 2007, the monument was taken to Shropshire, England to be repaired due to its poor condition and was returned to its original location in February 2008.

References

1809 births
1874 deaths
19th-century German Jews
German expatriates in the United Kingdom
German merchants
Burials at Belfast City Cemetery
Businesspeople from Hamburg
Businesspeople from Belfast
19th-century Irish businesspeople